Emmett Lee Mann (September 22, 1871 – July 18, 1923) was an American politician who served in the Virginia House of Delegates.

References

External links 

1871 births
1923 deaths
Members of the Virginia House of Delegates
20th-century American politicians